Michael Aloysius Donaldson (January 16, 1884 – April 12, 1970) was a United States Army sergeant and a recipient of the United States military's highest decoration, the Medal of Honor, for his actions in France during World War I.   He was a member of the Irish-American 165th Infantry Regiment (better known as "The Fighting 69th").  In addition to the Medal of Honor, Donaldson also received decorations from France and Montenegro and participated in the  Champagne-Marne, Aisne-Marne, St. Mihiel, Meuse-Argonne and Defensive Sector campaigns.

Medal of Honor Citation
Rank and organization: Sergeant, U.S. Army, Company I, 165th Infantry Regiment, 42nd Division. Place and date: At Sommerance-Landres-et St. Georges Road, France, 14 October 1918. Entered service at: Haverstraw, N.Y. Born: 1884, Haverstraw, N.Y. General Orders: War Department, General Orders No. 9, March 23, 1923.

Citation:
 
The advance of his regiment having been checked by intense machinegun fire of the enemy, who were entrenched on the crest of a hill before Landres-et St. Georges, his company retired to a sunken road to reorganize their position, leaving several of their number wounded near the enemy lines. Of his own volition, in broad daylight and under direct observation of the enemy and with utter disregard for his own safety, he advanced to the crest of the hill, rescued one of his wounded comrades, and returned under withering fire to his own lines, repeating his splendidly heroic act until he had brought in all the men, 6 in number.

Military Awards 
Donaldson's military decorations and awards include:

See also

List of Medal of Honor recipients
List of Medal of Honor recipients for World War I

References

External links

1884 births
1970 deaths
United States Army soldiers
United States Army personnel of World War I
United States Army Medal of Honor recipients
World War I recipients of the Medal of Honor
People from Haverstraw, New York